Shiga Lakes (滋賀レイクス), officially Shiga Lakestars, is a Japanese men's basketball team playing in the Western Conference of the B.League. They are based in the Shiga Prefecture.

Coaches

Bob Pierce (2008–10)
Takatoshi Ishibashi
Hirokazu Nema
Al Westover (2011–13)
Chris Boettcher (2013–14)
Koto Toyama (2014–17)
Shawn Dennis (2017-2021)
Luis Guil (2021–2022)
Takayuki Yasuda (2022-)

Roster

Notable players

Alfred Aboya
Wayne Arnold
Craig Brackins
Marshall Brown
Brandon Fields
D'or Fischer

Gary Hamilton
Chris Holm
Julian Mavunga
Shinya Ogawa
Lamar Rice
Omar Samhan
Hirotaka Sato
David Weaver
Terrance Woodbury
Luke Zeller

Arenas
Shiga Daihatsu Arena
Ukaruchan Arena
Moriyama Citizens Gymnasium
Proceed Arena Hikone
Hikone Citizens Sports Center
YMIT Arena

Practice facilities
Shiga Bank Gymnasium

References
Shiga Lakestars at Asia-basket.com
Team webpage

External links

 
Basketball teams in Japan
Sports teams in Shiga Prefecture
Basketball teams established in 2008
2008 establishments in Japan